This is a list of aircraft of Norwegian Air Shuttle and its subsidiaries for the individuals that are currently, or have previously been portrayed on the fleet.

Norwegian's livery consists of a red nose, followed by a blue ribbon and white, with the vertical stabilizer initially featuring historically distinctive Norwegians, Swedes, Danes, and Finns, but has since expanded to individuals of other nationalities across Europe and the Americas. An element of the airline's branding, the airline calls the practice its "Tail Fin Heroes" program, claiming that the personalities together with the aircraft's red nose signals the airline's change-maker spirit.

Note that the list might not portray the current status of a particular aircraft; portrayed individuals may not be replaced or follow onto new aircraft when their aircraft is retired, or as new ones join the fleet, or the registration numbers of aircraft in production are yet to be determined. Some individuals have also been portrayed on more than one type of aircraft, whether at separate times or simultaneously, such as Sonja Henie, who has appeared on the Boeing 737-300, Boeing 737-800, and Boeing 787-8.

In Fleet

Heroes by country

Out of Fleet

Special Liveries

Arctic Aviation Assets
Arctic Aviation Assets Ltd is Norwegian's wholly owned leasing company and manages Norwegian's fleet. It leases out the ordered Airbus A320neo aircraft to other airlines.

References

External links
 
 Planespotters.net: Norwegian Fleet Details and History

Norwegian Air Shuttle